The Coimbatore Nagercoil Fast Passenger is an Indian passenger train which runs from Coimbatore Junction to Nagercoil Junction. It was one of the long-distance passenger shuttles in India. This Fast Passenger Service is converted into Express Train service and renamed as Coimbatore Nagercoil Express in the year 2020. Currently  it runs as a day-time express service from Coimbatore to Nagercoil and vice versa. Owing to the conversion from fast passenger to express service, some of the stops for this train have been eliminated.

Important Stops for this train are:
Coimbatore Junction
Coimbatore North Junction
Peelamedu
Singanallur
Irugur
Somanur
Tirupur
Uthukuli
Erode Junction
Kodumudi
Pugalur
Karur Junction
Dindigul junction
Kodai Road
Sholavandan
Madurai Junction
Tirupparankundram
Tirumangalam
Virudunagar junction
Sattur
Kovilpatti
Vanchi maniyachi Junction
Tirunelveli Junction
Valliyur
Nagercoil

References

Slow and fast passenger trains in India
Rail transport in Tamil Nadu
Transport in Nagercoil